Zdeněk Zika (5 July 1950 – 3 July 2014) was a Czech rower. He competed in the men's eight event at the 1972 Summer Olympics.

References

External links
 

1950 births
2014 deaths
Czech male rowers
Olympic rowers of Czechoslovakia
Rowers at the 1972 Summer Olympics
People from Třeboň
Sportspeople from the South Bohemian Region